Sweden once had some fairly extensive narrow-gauge networks, but most narrow-gauge railways are now closed. The most common narrow gauge,  (3 Swedish feet), exists only in Sweden. A smaller  gauge network existed, and  gauge was used mostly by smaller, industrial railways.

railway lines
1,217 mm is equal to 4.1 Swedish feet. Compatible with 4 English feet.
; converted to standard gauge.

railway line
1,188 mm is equal to 4 Swedish feet.
Engelsberg–Norberg Railway, converted to standard gauge in 1876.

railway line 
 is equal to 44.42 pre 1863 Swedish inches 
; (converted to standard gauge)

railway line
This unique  gauge was created by a measure mistake.
Köping–Uttersberg–Riddarhyttan Railway, closed in 1968.

railway lines
Southern Sweden had a small  network, reaching for example Halmstad, Växjö, Torsås, Karlskrona, Ronneby, Karlshamn, and Kristianstad. As most of the railways in the province of Blekinge had this gauge, it was nicknamed "Blekinge gauge" in Sweden.

A few smaller lines also had this gauge:
Åre Bergbana
Sundsvall–Torpshammars Railway

railway lines

891 mm is equal to three Swedish feet.

Two large networks existed, separated by lake Vättern.  The western one covered much of the province of Västergötland, from Gothenburg in the southwest to Hjo in the east and Gullspång in the north.  The eastern network covered much of the provinces of Småland and Östergötland, stretching from Växjö and Torsås in the south to Örebro in the north.  There were also smaller  networks on Gotland and in Uppland, as well as separate lines in other regions, among them Öland.  Plans for connecting the two main networks were made but never fulfilled.

In the 21st century, only the Roslagsbanan commuter rail still functions as a commercial railway. There are also tourist or heritage traffic on some lines.

railway lines
 is equal to 2.7 Swedish feet.
; closed in stages after 1940, finally ceased in 1970

railway lines

Numerous  gauge agricultural and industrial railways were built. Nowadays a few are in use as tourist railways with steam trains.

; near Munkedal in Bohuslän, partly converted to standard gauge, partly remains operating as heritage.
; between Bor and Os, Värnamo in Småland, operating
Risten-Lakvik Museum Railway; using part of the former Norsholm-Västervik-Hultsfred line, in southern Östergötland between Norrköping and Åtvidaberg, operating

References

External links
A visitor's guide to Scandinavian (Nordic) narrow-gauge railways
 Ängelsberg-Snyten-Kärrgruvan

 
Sweden, Narrow gauge railways in